Masherbrum (formerly known as K1) is a mountain located in the Ghanche District, Gilgit Baltistan, Pakistan. At , it is the 22nd highest mountain in the world and the 9th highest in Pakistan. It was the first mapped peak in the Karakoram mountain range, hence the designation "K1".

Etymology
Although "brum" means mountain in Balti, the origin of "masher" is less clear.  Some have suggested that it derives from "Mashedar", meaning a muzzle-loader, due to the characteristic curvature of its summit as viewed from Baltoro Glacier.  In Persian, "masheh" means both matchlock and trigger, and "dar" is a suffix meaning "having".   Others have noted that "Masha" means lady, and "Masherbrum" is the "Queen of Peaks".  Still others have noted that "Masher" means "no sunlight", in reference to the year-round snow cover at the summit.

Geography
Masherbrum is the highest peak of the Masherbrum Mountains, a subrange of the Karakoram range. It is a large and striking peak, which is somewhat overshadowed by the nearby  peaks of the main range of the Karakoram which includes four of the fourteen Eight-thousanders, namely K2, Gasherbrum I, Broad Peak and Gasherbrum II. 
 
The Masherbrum Mountains lie to the south of the Baltoro Glacier and the main range of the Karakoram lies to the north of the Baltoro.  The main range is the continental divide of southern Asia.  Rivers to the south flow into the Arabian Sea.  Rivers to the north flow into the Tarim Basin.
 
The Baltoro Glacier is the route most commonly used to access the 8000m peaks of the Karakoram, and many trekkers also travel on the Baltoro. Masherbrum also lies at the north end of the Hushe Valley, which serves as the southern approach to the peak.

Climbing history 
In 1856, Thomas Montgomerie, a British Royal Engineers lieutenant, noticed a tall mountain in the Karakorams and called it K1 (denoting peak 1 of the Karakorams; K2 was the name he gave to the nearby peak behind K1 when viewed from Harmukh). To the local people of the area, it is known as Masherbrum.

Masherbrum was reconnoitered in 1911 by Fanny Bullock Workman and her husband, Dr. William H. Workman. It was first attempted in 1938 from the south, by a group led by James Waller which included Dawa Thondup and J. O. M. Roberts. The attempt failed just short of the summit, when J.B. Harrison and R.A. Hodgkin, severely frostbitten, had to return due to bad weather.

After two more failed expeditions, in 1955 and 1957, Masherbrum was first climbed in 1960 by George Irving Bell and Willi Unsoeld, led by the former, in an American-Pakistani expedition including Nick Clinch. They succeeded in climbing the southeast face route that had stymied the earlier parties.

The Himalayan Index lists three additional ascents and six additional failed attempts on Masherbrum. The ascents include two by additional routes, the NW Face and the NW Ridge/N Face.

In her book Voyage au Bout du Vide: Une Cordėe Alpine au Masherbrum, the French mountaineer Christine de Colombel provides a dramatic account of her 1980 attempt, with David Belden, to ascend Masherbrum in alpine style.  Their three-month expedition, bedeviled by bad weather, ended in failure when avalanches swept their camp and injured de Colombel, leading to a desperate three-day retreat in whiteout conditions.

See also
List of mountains in Pakistan

References

Sources
 H. Adams Carter, "Balti Place Names in the Karakoram", American Alpine Journal 49 (1975), p. 53.
 Jill Neate, High Asia: An Illustrated History of the 7000 Metre Peaks, 
 Himalayan Index

External links

  - photos
 Masherbrum on Summitpost - photos
 Masherbrum in Google Maps

Seven-thousanders of the Karakoram
Mountains of Gilgit-Baltistan